The 1999 Wokingham District Council election took place on 6 May 1999 to elect members of Wokingham Unitary Council in Berkshire, England. One third of the council was up for election and the Conservative party stayed in overall control of the council. Overall turnout was 29%.

After the election, the composition of the council was
Conservative 30
Liberal Democrat 24

Election result

Ward results

References

1999 English local elections
1999
1990s in Berkshire